Jerald Jackson Taylor (May 23, 1907 – March 31, 1995), was an Arizona politician and schoolteacher. A Republican, he served as mayor of Mesa, Arizona, and in both houses of the Arizona State Legislature.

References

External links
 

1907 births
1995 deaths
People from Sutton County, Texas
People from Brownwood, Texas
20th-century American educators
American school principals
Mayors of Mesa, Arizona
Republican Party members of the Arizona House of Representatives
Republican Party Arizona state senators
School board members in Arizona
Businesspeople from Texas
Baptists from Texas
Burials in Arizona
20th-century American businesspeople
20th-century American politicians
Baptists from Arizona
Educators from Texas
20th-century Baptists